Chaunteé Schuler (born October 15, 1982) is an American singer and actress.

Early life
Schuler was born in Alaska.  She was raised in Spotsylvania, Virginia. She started singing at a young age in her church choir.  After graduating from high school, she attended the University of Richmond.

Career
Schuler is a prolific stage actress, starring in productions such as The Lion King, Everyday Rapture, Applause, The Producers, Party Come Here, Dreamgirls, Crumbs from the Table of Joy, and Xanadu.

Her most notable television role was Bonnie McKechnie in the CBS TV series As the World Turns.

Awards
In 2006 Schuler was nominated for the Barrymore Award for Outstanding Leading Actress in a Musical for her work in Dreamgirls.

References 

1982 births
Living people